Ellet is a surname. Notable people with the surname include:

Alfred W. Ellet (1820–1895), American civil engineer and United States Army general
Charles Ellet Jr. (1810–1862), American civil engineer and United States Army officer
Charles R. Ellet (1843–1863), American surgeon and Union Army officer
Elizabeth F. Ellet (1818–1877), American writer, historian and poet
John A. Ellet (1838–1892), American Union Army officer